Curlewis may refer to :
Curlewis, New South Wales, Australia, in the New England region
Curlewis, Victoria, Australia, a suburb of Geelong
3898 Curlewis, a minor planet

People with the surname Curlewis
Adrian Curlewis (1901–1985), Australian judge, surfer, and sports administrator
Jean Curlewis (1898–1930), Australian author
Harold Curlewis (1875–1968), Australian astronomer
Herbert Curlewis (1869–1942), Australian judge and writer
John Stephen Curlewis (1863–1940), Chief Justice of the Union of South Africa